Neil Melville is an Australian actor. He was born in Sydney, but spent most of his childhood in Apollo Bay, Victoria.
In the early 1970s he was lead singer of Geelong rock band "The Iliad".
Melville graduated from Adelaide's Flinders University with a Bachelor of Arts in Drama, and performed in a number of university productions, including, most notably, the world premiere of Jack Hibberd's The Les Darcy Show (1974).

After graduating from university, Melville spent a year writing and performing for children with the Little Patch Theatre. While with this group, he wrote the vaudeville-documentary, Australian Born, Australian Bred. He has worked extensively as a character actor, appearing in numerous Australian theatre, film and television productions.

Melville has served as actor and director-in-residence at the University of Melbourne and worked as Executive Producer on ex-wife Debra Byrne's album, Heaven Down Here.

Melville is now married to Bo, and lives in Apollo Bay.

Partial theatre productions
 The Fantastics
 Othello
 Coriolanus
 Macbeth
 The Naked Vicar Show
 Evita
 Oklahoma
 On Our Selection
 This Old Man Comes Rolling Home
 The Magic Guritar
 The Les Darcy Show
 Blue Window
 Summer of the Seventeenth Doll
 The Life of Galileo
 The Ramayana
 Les Misérables
 Odyssey of a Prostitute

Partial television credits
 The Fast Lane
 The Flying Doctors
 The Henderson Kids
 Correlli
 Alice to Nowhere
 Dusty
 Phoenix
 Rafferty's Rules
 Prisoner
 A Country Practice
 Embassy
 Snowy
 The Man from Snowy River
 In Pursuit of Honor
 Ocean Girl
 Blue Heelers 
 McLeod's Daughters
 The Secret Life of Us
 The Saddle Club 
 Something in the Air
 Law of the Land
 Stingers
 Carson's Law
 Miss Fisher's Murder Mysteries
 Wentworth

Filmography
 Brilliant Lies
 Bushfire Moon
 Feathers
 In Pursuit of Honor
 Miracle Down Under
 Good Vibrations
 The Feds: Terror
 Halifax f.p: Isn't It Romantic (1998)
Halifax f.p: Playing God (2001)

References
 Stratton, David. "Brilliant Lies". Variety i2 (13–19 May 1996): 68
 
 Byrne Return Awaited
 Additional Neil Melville credits
 Brilliant Lies
 Neil and Bo Melville at Apollo Bay
 

Living people
Australian male film actors
Australian male soap opera actors
Australian male stage actors
Male actors from Melbourne
Year of birth missing (living people)
20th-century Australian male actors
21st-century Australian male actors